In enzymology, a keratan sulfotransferase is an enzyme that catalyzes the chemical reaction

3'-phosphoadenylyl sulfate + keratan  adenosine 3',5'-bisphosphate + keratan 6'-sulfate

Thus, the two substrates of this enzyme are 3'-phosphoadenylyl sulfate and keratan, whereas its two products are adenosine 3',5'-bisphosphate and keratan 6'-sulfate.

This enzyme belongs to the family of transferases, specifically the sulfotransferases, which transfer sulfur-containing groups.  The systematic name of this enzyme class is 3'-phosphoadenylyl-sulfate:keratan 6'-sulfotransferase. Other names in common use include 3'-phosphoadenylyl keratan sulfotransferase, keratan sulfate sulfotransferase, and 3'-phosphoadenylylsulfate:keratan sulfotransferase.

References

 

EC 2.8.2
Enzymes of unknown structure